The Hammersmith Murders is a 1930 murder mystery novel written by Leslie Ford, publishing under the name David Frome. Her third publication under that pen name, it was the first to feature her recurring character Evan Pinkerton.

External links 
The Hammersmith Murders at Fantastic Fiction

1930 American novels
Collins Crime Club books
Methuen Publishing books
Novels set in London